Sissy Spacek is an American noise band founded in 1999 in Los Angeles, California, United States, and currently consisting of official members John Wiese and Charlie Mumma, along with several collaborators both past and present. Since the release of their self-titled debut album in 2001, they have released a considerable catalogue encompassing genres which include harsh noise, noisecore, grindcore, free improvisation and musique concrete. Early releases consisted of collages of previously recorded demos and live performances with heavy use of cut-up editing. Many works have been released or re-released on Wiese's own label, Helicopter.

Past members or collaborators include Corydon Ronnau, Jesse Jackson, Danny McClain, Sara Taylor (Youth Code), Aaron Hemphill (Liars), Kevin Drumm, as well as Smegma, Hijokaidan and The Haters.

The band was featured at number 4 in LA Weekly's 2015 article, "The 20 Best Punk Bands in L.A. Right Now".

In 2018, the band toured the US and Japan.

Discography

Albums 
 Sissy Spacek (Helicopter/PACrec/A Dear Girl Called Wendy, 2001) - Italy
 Scissors (Helicopter/Misanthropic Agenda, 2002)
 Remote Whale Control (Helicopter/Misanthropic Agenda, 2003)
 Devils Cone And Palm (Helicopter/Misanthropic Agenda, 2006)
 French Record (Tape Room/Dual Plover, 2008) - Australia
 California Ax (Helicopter, 2008)
 Glass (Misanthropic Agenda, 2009)
 Gore Jet (Sweat Lung, 2009) - Australia
 15-Tet Oakland (Misanthropic Agenda, 2010)
 Sepsis (Second Layer, 2010) - UK
 Dash/Anti-Clockwise (EET/Gilgongo/Helicopter, 2011)
 Rip (Gilgongo/Helicopter, 2011)
 Freaked With Jet (Gilgongo, 2011)
 Grisp (Gilgongo, 2011)
 Harm (Troniks, 2012)
 Wastrel Projection (Antropofago Ateo/Handmade Birds, 2012)
 Wreck (Phage Tapes, 2013)
 Harm 2 (Troniks, 2013)
 Billions And Billions (Chondritic Sound/Claimed Responsibility, 2013)
 Sissy Spacek/K2, (Helicopter, 2014)
 First Four (Helicopter, 2015)
 Brath, (Oxen, 2015)
 Basement-Spear (Claimed Responsibility, 2015)
 Duration Groups (Helicopter, 2016)
 Reversed Normalization, (Helicopter, 2016)
 Disfathom, (Helicopter, 2016)
 Slow Move (Troniks, 2017)
 L/L (Helicopter, 2018)
 Pitched Intervention (Helicopter/Bank Burner, 2018)
 Trash Staging, (New Forces, 2018)
 Blear (Tape Room/Gilgongo, 2018)
 Ways Of Confusion (Nuclear War Now! Productions, 2018)
 Formation (Daymare Recordings, 2018) - Japan
 Spirant (Daymare Recordings, 2018) - Japan
 Expanding Antiverse (Dotsmark, 2018) - Japan
 Multifactorial Dynamic Pathways (with The Haters, Helicopter, 2019)
 Entropic (with Hijokaidan, Helicopter, 2019)
 Ballast (with Smegma, Helicopter, 2019)

References

External links 
 
 Discography at discogs.com

American experimental musical groups
Noise musical groups
American electronic musicians
Alien8 Recordings artists
Alternative Tentacles artists